Fir and Pond Woods is a 29 hectare nature reserve in Potters Bar in Hertfordshire. It is managed by the Herts and Middlesex Wildlife Trust. It is two separate woods, with Fir Wood connected by a short footpath to the large Pond Wood to the south.

The site is a remnant of the ancient Enfield Chase, and it has woodland, meadows and wetlands, and diverse bird life. Turkey Brook passes a meadow at the southern end of Pond Wood.

There is access from Coopers Lane Road opposite Hook Lane.

References

Herts and Middlesex Wildlife Trust reserves
Nature reserves in Hertfordshire
Potters Bar